Margaret Travolta (born December 31, 1946) is an American actress.

Early life
Margaret Travolta was born in Englewood, New Jersey to a Catholic family  as the daughter of Salvatore Travolta and Helen Cecilia nee Burke. She was one of six siblings: John, Joey, Ellen, Ann, and Sam. Her father was a former semi-professional football player who became a tire salesman and a partner in a tire company. Her mother was a former actress, director, and singer who appeared in The Sunshine Sisters, a radio vocal group. Later in life, Helen became a high school drama and English teacher. Margaret's father was a second-generation Italian American, and her mother was Irish American. Margaret was greatly influenced by her mother's involvement in local theater and her sister Ellen's success on stage from a young age. While studying at the American Academy of Dramatic Arts in New York City, Margaret supported herself by performing in children's theater, waiting tables, and singing in cabarets.

Career

Travolta's credits include performances in films such as "Hangman's Curse" with David Keith, "Catch Me If You Can" with Leonardo DiCaprio and Tom Hanks, "National Security" with Martin Lawrence and Steve Zahn, "High Fidelity" with John Cusack and Jack Black (as John Cusack's mother), and "While You Were Sleeping" with Sandra Bullock and Bill Pullman. Her television credits include the recurring roles  on "NYPD Blue" as Dr. Helen Boyd and on "Days of Our Lives" as Sister Mary Margaret, as well as guest starring appearances on shows as "The Drew Carey Show", "Strong Medicine", and "Early Edition".

Filmography

Film

Television

References

External links

20th-century American actresses
21st-century American actresses
American film actresses
American Academy of Dramatic Arts alumni
American people of Irish descent
American people of Italian descent
American television actresses
Living people
Travolta family
1946 births